In the Tanakh, Shicron was one of the landmarks at the western end of the north boundary of the Tribe of Judah (Joshua 15:1). It was probably located near Ekron.

Hebrew Bible places